The Brunswick Ballmaster Open is one of the world's most renowned annual ten-pin bowling tournaments.

The first tournament took place in 1971 with Josef Wiener of Sweden winning First Place at the Sporthall Bowl in Helsinki. The event then moved to the Ruusula Center in 1972, before making the Tali Bowl its home from 1974 onward.

This event usually sees 300 or more players, representing 16 nations, competing for the €83,000 total prize fund and first prize of €10,000.

It is the first European Bowling Tour (EBT) ranking event of 2006.

References
Ballmaster Magic
Brunswick Ballmaster Open

Ten-pin bowling competitions
Recurring sporting events established in 1971